Comamonas koreensis is a Gram-negative, aerobic, oxidase- and catalase-positive, nonfermentative bacterium with no flagella from the genus  Comamonas, which was isolated from a wetland sample in Woopo in the Republic of Korea.

References

External links
Type strain of Comamonas koreensis at BacDive -  the Bacterial Diversity Metadatabase

Comamonadaceae
Bacteria described in 2002